Statistics of Empress's Cup in the 2000 season.

Overview
It was contested by 19 teams, and Nippon TV Beleza won the championship.

Results

1st round
Seiwa Gakuen High School 1-0 Kamimura Gakuen High School
Sapporo Linda 0-2 Shimizudaihachi SC
Saibi High School 0-7 Nippon Sport Science University

2nd round
Nippon TV Beleza 8-0 Seiwa Gakuen High School
Renaissance Kumamoto FC 0-3 JEF United Ichihara
Speranza FC Takatsuki 7-0 Nawashiro Ladies
YKK Tohoku LSC Flappers 5-0 Nippon TV Menina
Tasaki Perule FC 10-1 Shimizudaihachi SC
Osaka University of Health and Sport Sciences 0-1 Urawa Reinas FC
Takarazuka Bunnys 3-0 Scramble FC
Nippon Sport Science University 0-3 Iga FC Kunoichi

Quarterfinals
Nippon TV Beleza 3-0 JEF United Ichihara
Speranza FC Takatsuki 2-1 YKK Tohoku LSC Flappers
Tasaki Perule FC 4-0 Urawa Reinas FC
Takarazuka Bunnys 0-4 Iga FC Kunoichi

Semifinals
Nippon TV Beleza 5-1 Speranza FC Takatsuki
Tasaki Perule FC 1-0 Iga FC Kunoichi

Final
Nippon TV Beleza 2-1 Tasaki Perule FC
Nippon TV Beleza won the championship.

References

Empress's Cup
2000 in Japanese women's football